The Beihai Tunnel is a tunnel in Nangan Township, Lienchiang County, Taiwan. It is located between Ren-ai Village and Meishi Village. The tunnel runs from Tieban Coast deep into the heart of the hills in lattice shape.

History
The tunnel was constructed in 1969-1971 by the Republic of China Armed Forces for ships to avoid bad weather and attacks from the People's Liberation Army in the aftermath of Second Taiwan Strait Crisis in 1958. It took 820 days for the tunnel to be completed which were mostly done by hand, with some exception of small amount of explosive. Some of the workers lost their lives during the construction process. At that time, the tunnel could harbor 120 small naval vessels but it was badly damaged after a severe typhoon hit the area.

After the return of Matsu Islands from military to civilians in 1992, the tunnel was remodeled and opened to the public in 2000.

Geology
The tunnel is 700 meters in length. It goes deep into the granite mountain and there is a waterway with 18 meters in height, 10 meters in width and 640 meters in length. Water inside the tunnel goes as deep as 4 meters during low tide and 8 meters during high tide.

See also
 Beihai Tunnel (Beigan)
 Beihai Tunnel (Dongyin)
 List of tourist attractions in Taiwan

References

1971 establishments in Taiwan
Military history of Taiwan
Nangang Township
Tunnels completed in 1971
Tunnels in Lienchiang County
Tunnel warfare